Wayne Township is one of nine townships in Hamilton County, Indiana, United States and serves as one of two townships within Noblesville, Indiana's jurisdiction. As of the 2010 census, its population was 7,886 and it contained 3,252 housing units, an increase from 2415 in 2000, as Noblesville continues to expand eastward and Fishers reaches its northern limits. In 2007, Noblesville officially opened one of the largest mixed use developments in the state, called the Noblesville Corporate Campus. A portion of the development is located within the township. When completed, it will include a large industrial/commercial park, several housing developments, hotels, greenspace and a large outdoor shopping center called Hamilton Town Center, being built by the Simon Property Group, headquartered in nearby Indianapolis.

Hamilton Southeastern Schools serve Wayne Township.

Wayne Township is served by Wayne Township Volunteer Fire Department. An active volunteer fire department running over 350 calls per year, the department provides Advanced Life Support medical service, fire protection, and rescue services to residents. The department operates out of Station 15 on Durbin Road, with Engine 315, Tanker 315, Ambulance 315, Squad 315, Grass 315, and Rescue 315. Consisting of 25 members the department has two firefighters on shift daily (Monday through Friday) and two volunteer firefighters on shift overnight and on weekends.

History
Wayne Township was organized in 1833.

Geography
The streams of Gwinn Ditch, Lock Ditch, Mud Creek, Sand Creek, Stony Creek, and William Lehr Ditch run through this township.

Cities and towns
 Noblesville (east edge)

Unincorporated communities
 Clarksville
 Durbin

Adjacent townships
 White River Township (north)
 Jackson Township, Madison County (northeast)
 Stony Creek Township, Madison County (east)
 Green Township, Madison County (southeast)
 Fall Creek Township (south)
 Noblesville Township (west)

Cemeteries
The township contains five cemeteries: Bethel, Ervin, Prairie Baptist, Stern and Stony Creek.

Major highways
 Indiana State Road 13
 Indiana State Road 32
 Indiana State Road 38
 Indiana State Road 238

Education
Secondary students in Wayne Township attend Hamilton Southeastern High School in nearby Fishers. Wayne Township residents may obtain a free library card from the Hamilton East Public Library in Noblesville.

References
 U.S. Board on Geographic Names (GNIS)
 United States Census Bureau cartographic boundary files

External links
 Indiana Township Association
 United Township Association of Indiana

Townships in Hamilton County, Indiana
Townships in Indiana